
This is a list of the 27 players who earned 2016 European Tour professional golf cards through Q School in 2015.

 2016 European Tour rookie

2016 Results

* European Tour rookie in 2016
T = Tied
 The player retained his European Tour card for 2017 (finished inside the top 111).
 The player did not retain his European Tour card for 2017, but retained conditional status (finished between 112 and 148, inclusive).
 The player did not retain his European Tour card for 2017 (finished outside the top 148).

McEvoy, Manley, Canter, and Molinari regained their cards for 2017 through Q School.

Runners-up on the European Tour in 2016

See also
2015 Challenge Tour graduates
2016 European Tour

References

External links
Official website

European Tour
European Tour Qualifying School Graduates
European Tour Qualifying School Graduates